Nunawading  is a suburb of Melbourne, Victoria, Australia, 18 km (11 miles) east of Melbourne's Central Business District, located within the Whitehorse local government area. Nunawading recorded a population of 12,413 at the 2021 census.

Most of Nunawading is located in the City of Whitehorse, although the City of Manningham governs part of it. It is centred at the intersection of Whitehorse Road and Springvale Road, in Melbourne's eastern suburbs and is the site of the main office of the City of Whitehorse, as well as large retail (e.g. furniture, auto dealerships, hardware, and electrical) and wholesale businesses, along Whitehorse Road.

History
The name Nunawading, thought to be derived from an Aboriginal word meaning either "battlefield" or "ceremonial ground", was initially applied to a vast area which now incorporates Box Hill, Blackburn, Mitcham, Forest Hill and Vermont.

The township of Nunawading began life in the 1870s as a site of brick and clay production. The name Tunstall, derived from the famed English pottery town, was given to the area, centred at the intersection of Whitehorse Road and Springvale Road. The former name is still reflected in Tunstall Park, on Luckie Street, Tunstall Avenue, off Springvale Road, and the Tunstall Square Shopping Centre, on Tunstall Road, in nearby Donvale. The opening of the Tunstall railway station contributed to the growth of brick and clay industries, with orchards soon following. Tunstall Post Office opened on 1 February 1889 and was renamed Nunawading in 1945.

Following a series of local government subdivisions in the 1920s, the name Nunawading fell from use. The name was reinstated in 1945 when it replaced Tunstall.

The period following World War II saw a housing boom in the area, as residential blocks began to replace orchards. The civic centre was opened in 1968 and became the administrative centre for the City of Nunawading, which was incorporated into the City of Whitehorse, in 1994, along with the City of Box Hill.

Today
Whitehorse Road is the site of the largest retail strip for bulkgoods in Melbourne. The City of Whitehorse has named this strip the Mega Mile, in an attempt to provide brand recognition for retailers. Nunawading is home to a large Pacific Brands clothing factory and a brick factory. A large Seventh-day Adventist campus exists on Central Road, including a church, church offices, a retail book shop, Coronella Retirement Village and the coeducational Nunawading Christian College (primary and secondary). There is also a combined kindergarten and primary school, Mount Pleasant Road Primary School, located on Mount Pleasant Road. The head office of Bird Observation & Conservation Australia is in Springvale Road. The suburb was formerly home to the Winlaton Youth Training Centre, the Wobbies World amusement park, and the Melbourne studios of Network 10 television, where the soap opera Neighbours was filmed.

Nunawading has benefited from the new railway station, one of the larger metropolitan stations in the eastern suburbs, and the Springvale Road grade separation, in 2010. The southern and northern areas of Nunawading are now more unified, with better access to the Eastern Freeway, which runs along the north the suburb.

The Nunawading Primary School on Springvale Road closed in 2012 and the main building is now the Nunawading Community Hub, which opened in 2020. The new Whitehorse Primary School opened on the site of the old Springview Primary School, and is next door to St. Phillip's Catholic primary school. Mount Pleasant Road Primary School, formerly Nunawading South Primary School, is located on the corner of Mount Pleasant Road and Eugenia Street.

Demographics
In the 2016 census, the population of Nunawading was 11,876, with 51.6% being female and 48.4% male.

The median/average age of the people in Nunawading is 38. 59.6% of people living in Nunawading were born in Australia. The other major countries of birth were  China (7.3%), India (3.9%), England (2.4%), Malaysia (2.0%), and Vietnam (1.8%). 61.4% of people living in Nunawading spoke English only. The other main languages spoken were Mandarin (8.7%), Cantonese (4.9%), Vietnamese (1.9%), Hindi (1.7%), and Greek (1.4%).

In the 2016 census, 30.1% of people were attending an educational institution. Of those, 26.0% were in primary school, 20.2% in secondary school, and 24.1% in a tertiary or technical institution. 34.9% said they had no religion, an 8.7% increase from 2011, 17.8% identified as Catholic, a 4.15% decrease from the 2011 census, and 7.7% Anglican, a 2.9% decrease from 2011. 8.1% did not state a religious affiliation, and 5.1% identified as Buddhist.

Sport
The area has an Association Football team, Nunawading City FC, that competes in NPL2 Victoria. It also has an Australian rules football team, the Nunawading Lions, competing in the Eastern Football League. However, their home ground is in the suburb of Blackburn North.

The Nunawading Cricket Club is based at Mahoneys Reserve, in Forest Hill. Competing in the Box Hill Reporter District Cricket Association, the club holds the record number of premierships in the competition and has been the breeding ground of many prominent Australian cricketers, including the Victorian and Tasmanian seam bowler David Saker, after whose ancestors the club's main ground is named.

Nunawading is home to the Nunawading Swimming Club, which is the largest swimming club in the Southern Hemisphere.

Nunawading is also home to the Beavers Basketball Team and Nunawading Netball Team. The Beavers currently play section 9 on Sundays and are aiming to win the championship this season under the guidance of ex-Warrior Nick Papaziakas.

Although their home ground, Nunawading Stadium, is in Burwood East, the Nunawading Spectres represent Nunawading in the Melbourne East Basketball Association (MEBA).

Notable people
Michael George - VFL footballer
Mark Jackson - VFL footballer
Cecilia McIntosh - athlete and AFL footballer
Ian Stacker - basketball player and coach

See also
 City of Nunawading – Nunawading was previously within this former local government area.

References

Suburbs of Melbourne
Suburbs of the City of Whitehorse
Suburbs of the City of Manningham